Annie Wells (born March 24, 1954) is an American photographer, winner of a Pulitzer Prize for Spot News Photography.

Life
She graduated from University of California, Santa Cruz with a B.A. in 1981, and studied photojournalism at San Francisco State University where she was part of a group that won the RFK public service award.

She worked as a photographer for the Santa Rosa Press Democrat, San Francisco bureau Associated Press, the Greeley Tribune in Greeley, Colorado, and the Herald Journal in Logan, Utah.

She joined the Los Angeles Times in 1997.
In October 2008, she was laid off from the Los Angeles Times.

She is a survivor of breast cancer.

Award
 1997: Pulitzer Prize for Spot News Photography

References

External links
"Interview with Glenn Koenig", BrooWaha, February 11, 2007 
RFK Journalsim Awards

Photographers from California
1954 births
Living people
Los Angeles Times people
University of California, Santa Cruz alumni
San Francisco State University alumni
Pulitzer Prize for Photography winners
American women photographers
21st-century American women